Kenzi, also known as Kenuzi, Kunuz, or Mattokki, is a Nubian language of Egypt. It is spoken north of Mahas in Egypt.
It is closely related to Dongolawi or Andaandi, a Nubian Language of Sudan. The two have historically been considered two varieties of one language. More recent research recognizes them as distinct languages without a "particularly close genetic relationship." With population displacement due to the Aswan High Dam there are communities of speakers in Lower Egypt. Recent linguistic research on the Kenzi language has been conducted by Ahmed Sokarno Abdel-Hafiz.

Kenzi is currently a threatened language that has about 50,000 native speakers worldwide. Most of the Kenzi speaking people live in the city of Kom Ombo in the Aswan Governorate of Egypt.

Phonology

Consonants 

 /s/ can be heard as voiced [z] when preceding voiced stops.
 /n/ is heard as velar [ŋ] when before velar stops. /l/ is heard as velarized [ɫ] when in the same position.

Vowels

External links
 Learning the Nubian Language (Mattokki) Series on Youtube - Lesson 1 (in Arabic).

References

Nubian languages
Languages of Egypt